Walter Jack Duncan (1881–1941) was a war artist for the United States Army during World War I.

Background
He was born in Indianapolis, Indiana.  His family included a number of prominent actors, and upon graduation from high school, he -- along with a writer-artist friend, Robert Cortes Holliday -- moved to New York city to study at the Art Students' League under the prominent landscape artist John H. Twachtman. After three years at the League, Duncan began his long career of magazine illustration with Century Magazine. Some of his other magazine credits include Scribner's, McClure's Magazine, and Harper's. His varied illustration assignments before the war had given him the opportunity to travel abroad to Canada and England. He also spent time in the backwoods of Kentucky drawing the descendants of Daniel Boone in their natural habitat.

Like William James Aylward's, much of Duncan's wartime effort focused on the support activities of the AEF. He traveled from the ports to the battlefield producing detailed works that recorded some of the less glamorous but essential aspects of modern warfare. Much of his work reflects the influence of his studying under a landscape artist.

Duncan's favorite medium was pen and ink, and he especially liked producing illustrations for books. His work in that medium earned him the accolade of "wizard of pen and ink" from contemporary artists. During his career he became associated with a number of writers, working closely with them to illustrate their books. After the war he illustrated a number of Christopher Morley's books, including Plum Pudding and Pipefuls.

References

External links

 
 

United States Army artists
Artists from Indianapolis
1881 births
1941 deaths
Art Students League of New York alumni
American illustrators
World War I artists